Matteo Garrone (born 15 October 1968) is an Italian filmmaker. Born in Rome, the son of a theatre critic, Nico Garrone and a photographer, in  1996 Garrone won the Sacher d'Oro, an award sponsored by Nanni Moretti, with the short film Silhouette, that became one of the three episodes that are on his first long feature, Terra di Mezzo in 1997. 

He won Best Director at the European Film Awards and at the David di Donatello Awards for Gomorrah (2008), among many other awards. His film Reality (2012) competed in competition at the 2012 Cannes Film Festival and won the Grand Prix.

His films Tale of Tales (2015) and Dogman (2018) were selected to compete for the Palme d'Or at the 2015 Cannes Film Festival and the 2018 Cannes Film Festival respectively. The Nastro d'argento awarded Garrone both Best Producer and Best Director with Dogman. He received the latter again for Pinocchio (2019).

Filmography

Director

Short films
 Silhouette (1996)
 Bienvenido espirito santo (1997)
 Un caso di forza maggiore (1997)
 Oreste Pipolo, fotografo di matrimoni (1998)
 Before Design: Classic (2016)
 Delightful (2017)
 Entering Red (2019)
 Le mythe Dior (2020)
 The Tarot Deck (Le château du tarot) (2021)

Feature films
 1996 – Terra di mezzo
 1998 – Guests (Ospiti)
 2000 – Roman Summer (Estate romana)
 2002 – The Embalmer (L'imbalsamatore)
 2003 – First Love (Primo amore)
 2008 – Gomorrah (Gomorra)
 2012 – Reality
 2015 – Tale of Tales (Il racconto dei racconti)
 2018 – Dogman
 2019 – Pinocchio

Producer
 Silhouette (1996)
 Terra di mezzo (1996)
 Ospiti (1998)
 Estate romana (2000)
 Mid-August Lunch (2008)

Collaborators
Garrone likes to work with the same team of filmmakers, often hiring cast and crew from his previous films. Regular members of the 'team' include:

References

Bibliography
Luciana d'Arcangeli, ‘Fatalmente tua: Garrone, il noir e le donne’, in the special issue “An Eye on Italy” on Italian Cinema of the e-journal Flinders University Languages Group Online Review – FULGOR, Volume 5, Issue 3, June 2018, pp.14-26 - https://www.fulgor.online/vol5-issue3-2018-forthcoming
Luciana d'Arcangeli. "The Films of Matteo Garrone: Italian Cinema Is Not Embalmed" in William Hope (ed) "Italian Film Directors in the New Millennium". Cambridge, Cambridge Scholars Press, 2010, pp. 175–187.
Pierpaolo De Sanctis, Domenico Monetti, Luca Pallanch. "Non solo Gomorra. Tutto il cinema di Matteo Garrone", Rome, Edizioni Sabinae, 2008.

External links

IMDb: Matteo Garrone

1968 births
Living people
David di Donatello winners
European Film Award for Best Director winners
European Film Award for Best Screenwriter winners
Film directors from Rome
Nastro d'Argento winners